Tecma Sport is a French aircraft manufacturer based in Saint-Pierre-en-Faucigny and formerly in La Roche-sur-Foron. The company specializes in the design and manufacture of hang gliders and paragliders in the form of ready-to-fly aircraft. The company also makes ultralight trikes and hang glider harnesses.

The company seems to have been founded about 1982, when it produced the Tecma Mirage and Tecma Spirale hang glider models.

The company produces a wide range of hang gliders, including the Tecma F1 Tempo series and Tecma FX in the mid-2000s. The two-place Tecma Medium has been in production since 1985.

Aircraft

References

External links

Aircraft manufacturers of France
Ultralight aircraft
Hang gliders
Ultralight trikes
Paragliders
Manufacturing companies established in 1982
French companies established in 1982
Companies based in Auvergne-Rhône-Alpes